Stalin's Monument was a  granite statue honoring Joseph Stalin in Prague, Czechoslovakia. It was unveiled on 1 May 1955 after more than  years of work, and was the world's largest representation of Stalin. The sculpture was demolished in late 1962.

History
The monument was located on a huge concrete pedestal, which can still be visited in Letná Park. The sculptor was Otakar Švec, who killed himself a few days before the unveiling.

The process of de-Stalinization began shortly after the unveiling of the monument. The monument, therefore, became a liability to the Communist Party of Czechoslovakia.

Later use of site

In 1990, pirate radio station Radio Stalin operated from a bomb shelter beneath the statue's plinth.  The same shelter was also the home of Prague's first rock club in the early 1990s. Since 1991, the marble pedestal has been used as the base of a giant kinetic sculpture of a metronome. In 1996, the pedestal was briefly used as a base for a  statue of Michael Jackson as a promotional stunt for the start of his HIStory World Tour. A billboard promoting Civic Democratic Party leader Václav Klaus was erected on the site during the Czech parliamentary elections of 1998 but was removed soon after due to high winds.

A green plaque below the metronome reads:
Metronome
Letenské sady
The Metronome, the work of sculptor
Vratislav Karel Novák, was erected in
1991 atop the massive stone plinth that
originally served as the base
for the monument to Soviet leader Josef
Vissarionovich Stalin.
Work began on Prague's Stalin monument
towards the end of 1949, and in May 1955,
it was finally unveiled. The largest group
sculpture in Europe during its existence,
the monument had a reinforced-concrete
structure faced with 235 granite blocks,
weighing 17,000 tonnes and costing
140 million crowns to complete.
The gigantic composition, by sculptor
Otakar Švec and the architects Jiří
and Vlasta [his wife] Štursa, did not tower for long
over the medieval centre of Prague:
in connection with Soviet criticism
of Stalin's "cult of personality," the work
was dynamited and removed towards the end
of 1962.

The City of Prague has been considering several options for redevelopment of the site for years, including a plan to build an aquarium. The remaining socle is a popular meeting point for skateboarders and other people.

See also

Stalin Monument (Budapest)
Socialist realism
List of tallest statues

References

External links

 Article from Prague local about Stalin monument
 1990 Bomb shelter housing Stalin Club and pirat radio station, photo by Peter Lind

1955 sculptures
Buildings and structures demolished in 1962
Colossal statues
Czechoslovakia–Soviet Union relations
Demolished buildings and structures in the Czech Republic
Destroyed sculptures
History of Prague
Monuments and memorials in Prague
Outdoor sculptures in Prague
Statues of Joseph Stalin
Buildings and structures completed in 1955
1955 establishments in Czechoslovakia
Prague 7
Stalin, Prague
1962 disestablishments in Czechoslovakia
20th-century architecture in the Czech Republic